St. Colman's Primary School may refer to:

St. Colman's Primary School, Kilkeel, Kilkeel, County Down, Northern Ireland
St. Colman's Primary School, Saval, County Down, Northern Ireland
St. Colman's Primary School, Annaclone, Annaclone, County Down, Northern Ireland
St. Colman's Primary School, Lawrencetown, Lawrencetown, County Down, Northern Ireland
St. Colman's Primary School, Dromore, County Down, Northern Ireland
St. Colman's Catholic School, Turtle Creek, Turtle Creek, Pennsylvania, United States